Dawn of a New Day is an album by American jazz guitarist O'Donel Levy recorded in 1971 and released on the Groove Merchant label.

Reception 

Allmusic's Jason Ankeny said: "Dawn of a New Day expands the Baroque funk horizons introduced on the brilliant Breeding of Mind, O'Donel Levy's previous collaboration with arranger Manny Albam. A bigger, bolder effort, Dawn 's panoramic sound also borrows much from blaxploitation cinema. ... Levy's remarkable leads seem to cut and paste elements from across the history of jazz guitar, most closely recalling the lean, mean genius of Wes Montgomery and Grant Green. His solos are graceful yet muscular, each note crackling with energy. The material here is also excellent".

Track listing
All compositions by O'Donel Levy except where noted
 "Dawn of a New Day" – 4:14
 "Baa Waa" – 3:37
 "I Wanna Be Where You Are" (Arthur Ross, Leon Ware) – 3:32
 "Where Is the Love" (Ralph MacDonald, William Slater) – 2:34
 "People Make the World Go Round" (Thom Bell, Linda Creed) – 4:42
 "Maiden Voyage" (Herbie Hancock) – 5:49
 "Super Woman" (Stevie Wonder) – 4:43
 "I Want to Make It with You" (Roy Hines, Robert Esenberg, Wayne Weaver, Rich Barthlow, David Liebman) – 3:43
 "Goin' on to Detroit" (Wes Montgomery) – 4:13

Personnel
O'Donel Levy – guitar
Cecil Bridgewater, Burt Collins, Jon Faddis, Marvin Stamm – trumpet
Wayne Andre, Eddie Burt, William Watrous – trombone
Charles Covington – electric piano, organ
 George Russell – bass
Chester Thompson – drums
Manny Albam – arranger, conductor

References

Groove Merchant albums
O'Donel Levy albums
1973 albums
Albums produced by Sonny Lester
Albums arranged by Manny Albam
Albums conducted by Manny Albam